Buscaglia is an Italian-language surname. Notable people with the name include:

Carlo Buscaglia (1909–1981), Italian footballer
Carlo Emanuele Buscaglia (1915–1944), Italian aviator
Charlie Buscaglia (born 1979), American basketball coach
Edgardo Buscaglia, Italian academic
Guido Buscaglia (born 1996), Argentine swimmer
José Buscaglia Guillermety (born 1938), Puerto Rican sculptor
Leo Buscaglia (1924–1998), American author and motivational speaker
Maurizio Buscaglia (born 1969), Italian basketball coach
Pietro Buscaglia (1911–1997), Italian footballer

Italian-language surnames